Lý Thái Hùng is general secretary of Vietnam Reform Party, Viet Tan. He was elected in September 2006 at the 6th Party Congress.

Life 
Ly Thai Hung obtained a Masters in Civil Engineering in Japan in 1979.

In the late 1970s, Ly Thai Hung was a member of the Organization of Free Vietnamese, one of the first overseas Vietnamese pro-democracy organizations after the fall of Saigon. During the same period, addressing the main issue of the Vietnamese boat people, Ly Thai Hung worked with different Japanese human rights organizations and political associations to rescue and to provide help to the refugees. The Refugees Relief Association that he founded still operates today.

Viet Tan 
Ly Thai Hung joined the Viet Tan in 1982 and has held various leadership positions since then. In 1993 he was appointed Deputy Secretary of the Overseas Party Branch. In 2001 he was elected General Secretary of the Party and at the 6th Congress of the Party in September 2006 he was re-elected for the 2006-2011 term.

In October 2007 on a trip through Europe, he met with Polish journalist Robert Krzyston, one of the leaders of The Committee for Freedom of Speech in Poland, a pro-democracy organization with members being mostly intellectuals and reporters. While in Warsaw, Mr. Hung appeared on Radio Warsaw FM 106 to discuss the democracy movement in Vietnam. The trip concluded with a meeting with Dr. Bogdan Borusewicz, Chairman of the Polish Senate.

Publications 
Ly Thai Hung is also author of the book Eastern Europe in Vietnam (in Vietnamese), published in 2006.

See also
 Viet Tan

Notes and references 

1952 births
Living people
Vietnamese anti-communists
Vietnamese democracy activists